GATV may refer togta5

Gemini-Agena Target Vehicle
Government-access television; Public, educational, and government access (PEG Channels); Cable television in the United States